Carnbroe railway station served the ironworks in the neighbourhood of Carnbroe, North Lanarkshire, Scotland, from 1843 to 1846 on the Wishaw and Coltness Railway.

History 
The station was opened on 5 May 1843 by the Wishaw and Coltness Railway. It was mentioned as Carnbroe Ironworks when it first appeared in the company timetable, although it was amended on 3 June 1844. It was a Short-lived station, closing 3 years later in 1846.

References 

Disused railway stations in North Lanarkshire
Railway stations in Great Britain opened in 1843
Railway stations in Great Britain closed in 1846
1843 establishments in Scotland
1846 disestablishments in Scotland